Jeremy Drummond (born April 6, 1983) is a published author of several novels. He resides in Detroit, Michigan.

Biography
Born in Flint, Michigan, to parents, Iverson & Bennita Drummond he picked up writing at an early age from them. His father being a General Motors foreman and also a published poet and his mother an elementary school librarian. He later moved to New York before finally residing in Detroit, MI.

Novels

Drummond primarily writes gritty Urban fiction that depicts drug dealers, ex cons, and prostitutes.

Drummond became known for his Urban Novel Dutchess. The ebook version has remained in the top 100 African American novels on Amazon.com since its release. His novels are sold throughout many mediums including Barnes and Nobles.

On April 27, 2010, Drummond released a mainstream fiction work entitled "Escaping The Rain", A Nick Aldo Mystery. While evaluating further opportunities, Drummond is working on expanding his detective series, and releasing the sequel to Dutchess.

His work is constantly checked out in Libraries across the United States, since being reviewed by prestigious places as the Library Journalas well as the highly respected African American OOSA Book Club where it only received two out of five stars.

References 
  Verified By Cocatalog Search September 15, 2010 
   Library Journal Review June 2010 
   Respected African-American OOSA Book Club Review 
  Search Local Libraries for Title 
  Dutchess Ebook, Amazon April 1, 2010
  Amazon Bestseller List African American September 15, 2010
   Escaping The Rain, Nick Aldo Mystery April 27, 2010

External links
Official Website

Writers from Michigan
1983 births
Living people